Yoo Mi (born 9 May 1986 in Seoul) is a former South Korean tennis player.

She has a career-high singles ranking of world No. 299, and a best doubles ranking of 203, both achieved on 8 September 2014.

Yoo made her WTA Tour debut at the 2009 Hansol Korea Open, where she had been given a wildcard into the singles main draw. She lost in the first round to Meghann Shaughnessy.

Playing in Fed Cup for South Korea, Yoo has a win–loss ratio of 10–10.

ITF Circuit finals

Singles: 11 (6 titles, 5 runner-ups)

Doubles: 35 (18 titles, 17 runner-ups)

External links
 
 
 

1986 births
Living people
South Korean female tennis players
Tennis players from Seoul
Sportspeople from Daegu
Tennis players at the 2006 Asian Games
Tennis players at the 2014 Asian Games
Universiade medalists in tennis
Universiade bronze medalists for South Korea
Asian Games competitors for South Korea
Medalists at the 2007 Summer Universiade
Medalists at the 2011 Summer Universiade
21st-century South Korean women